Holocarpha virgata is a species of flowering plant in the family Asteraceae known by the common names yellowflower tarweed, pitgland tarweed, and narrow tarplant.

Distribution
Holocarpha virgata is endemic to California, where it is most common in the San Joaquin Valley and Sacramento Valley of the Central Valley, and adjacent foothills of the Inner Coast Ranges and Sierra Nevada (U.S.). There are additional populations in foothills of the Peninsular Ranges in San Diego County, western Riverside County, and Orange County.

Description
It has many branches and is lined with oily glands and hairs.

The inflorescence is made up of several short branches lined densely in small, thick, green bracts. The bracts are just a few millimeters long and are tipped with glands. At the ends of the branches are flower heads, each lined with phyllaries which are covered in knobby resin glands. Each head contains 9-25 disc florets which are yellow with black or purplish anthers. The head has a fringe of 3-7 yellow ray florets which often have lobed tips.

Subspecies
Holocarpha virgata  subsp. elongata D. D. Keck -  San Diego County, western Riverside County, and Orange County
Holocarpha virgata  subsp. virgata  - Central Valley, etc.

References

External links
Jepson Manual Treatment: Holocarpha virgata

United States Department of Agriculture Plants Profile for Holocarpha virgata
Holocarpha virgata — Calphotos Photo gallery, University of California

Madieae
Endemic flora of California
Flora of the Sierra Nevada (United States)
Natural history of the California chaparral and woodlands
Natural history of the Central Valley (California)
Natural history of the California Coast Ranges
Natural history of the Peninsular Ranges
Natural history of San Diego County, California
Plants described in 1859
Flora without expected TNC conservation status